SC Chaika Petropavlivska Borshchahivka is a Ukrainian football club from Petropavlivska Borshchahivka, Bucha Raion, just outside Kyiv. The club plays in Ukrainian Second League since 2018. Chaika plays its home matches at the Kozak-Arena.

History
The club was founded in 1976 and participated in the regional competition. With fall of the Soviet Union, club disappeared. In 2008 it was reestablished again and almost for its first decade competed exclusively at regional level.

The club was admitted to the Professional Football League of Ukraine after passing attestation for the 2018–19 Ukrainian Second League season.

Honors
Ukrainian Amateur Cup
Winners (2): 2013, 2016–17
 Kyiv Oblast Championship
Winners (1): 2015
Runners-up (4): 2011, 2012, 2013, 2014
Kyiv Oblast Cup
Winners (1): 2013

Current squad

League and cup history

{|class="wikitable"
|-bgcolor="#efefef"
! Season
! Div.
! Pos.
! Pl.
! W
! D
! L
! GS
! GA
! P
!Domestic Cup
!colspan=2|Other
!Notes
|-
| align="center" |2016
| align="center" |4th Gr.4
| align="center"  bgcolor=tan|3
| align="center" |6
| align="center" |1 
| align="center" |2
| align="center" |3
| align="center" |5
| align="center" |10
| align="center" |5
| align="center" |
| align="center" |
| align="center" |
| align="center" |
|-
| align="center" |2016–17
| align="center" |4th Gr.A
| align="center"  bgcolor=silver|2
| align="center" |20
| align="center" |12
| align="center" |3
| align="center" |5
| align="center" |28
| align="center" |16
| align="center" |39
| align="center" |Amateur Cup
| align="center" |UAC
| align="center" bgcolor=gold|Winner
| align="center" |
|-
| align="center" |2017–18
| align="center" |4th Gr.B
| align="center" |5
| align="center" |14
| align="center" |4
| align="center" |5
| align="center" |5
| align="center" |14
| align="center" |19
| align="center" |17
| align="center" |Amateur Cup
| align="center" |UAC
| align="center" | finals
| align="center" |
|-bgcolor=PowderBlue
| align="center" |2018–19
| align="center" |3rd "A"
| align="center" |8/10
| align="center" |27
| align="center" |8
| align="center" |7
| align="center" |12
| align="center" |25
| align="center" |28
| align="center" |31
| align="center" | finals
| align="center" |
| align="center" |
| align="center" |
|-bgcolor=PowderBlue
| align="center" |2019–20
| align="center" |3rd "A"
| align="center" |7/11
| align="center" |20
| align="center" |7
| align="center" |5
| align="center" |8
| align="center" |25
| align="center" |21
| align="center" |26
| align="center" | finals
| align="center" |
| align="center" |
| align="center" |
|}

Managers
 ?–2015 Oleksandr Ihnatyev
 2016–2017 Viktor Yaichnyk
 2017 Serhiy Konyushenko
 2018 Anatoliy Kretov
 2018 Viacheslav Bohodyelov
 2018–2020 Taras Ilnytskyi
 2020 Oleksandr Protchenko (interim)
 2020–2021 Oleksandr Shcherbakov
 2021– Viacheslav Bohodyelov (interim)

References

External links
 Official website
 Chaika Kyiv-Sviatoshyn Raion at UA-Football
 Chaika defeated professionals at the Kyiv Oblast Football Federation
 Club's information at the AAFU.

 
Football clubs in Kyiv Oblast
Ukrainian Second League clubs
2008 establishments in Ukraine
Association football clubs established in 2008